{{DISPLAYTITLE:Faith (H2O album)}}

Faith is the debut and only studio album by Scottish pop band H2O. It was originally released in 1984 on the label RCA. The album was recorded over a period of five months between October 1983 and March 1984, in sessions that took place at Livingston Studios, in London. It features their bestselling singles, "I Dream to Sleep" and "Just Outside of Heaven", both of which preceded the album being released the year before.

In 2009, a digitally remastered CD of the album was released with six bonus tracks by Cherry Red.

Critical reception
Pemberton Roach of AllMusic gave the album two out of five stars and called the album "an obscure gem of 1980's New Romantic synth pop" adding that Faith "makes a strong bid for lost classic status."

Track listing

Personnel
H2O
Ian Donaldson – vocals
Ross Alcock – keyboards; synthesizer; piano; vocoder
Colin Gavigan – saxophone
Pete Keane – guitar
Kenny Dorman – drums; percussion
Colin Ferguson – bass guitar

Additional personnel
Sylvia James – backing vocals on "Just Outside of Heaven"
Dee Lewis – backing vocals on "Just Outside of Heaven"
Shirley Lewis – backing vocals on "Just Outside of Heaven"

Production team
Tony Cox – producer
David Bascombe – producer; engineer
Felix Kendall – assistant engineer
Andrew Christian – art direction
Shoot That Tiger! – design
Allan Ballard – photography

References

External links

1984 debut albums
H2O (Scottish band) albums
RCA Records albums